The Antwerp School was a school of artists active in Antwerp, first during the 16th century when the city was the economic center of the Low Countries, and then during the 17th century when it became the artistic stronghold of the Flemish Baroque under Peter Paul Rubens.

History
Antwerp took over from Bruges as the main trading and commercial center of the Low Countries around 1500. Painters, artists and craftsmen joined the Guild of Saint Luke, which educated apprentices and guaranteed quality.

The first school of artists that emerged in the city were the Antwerp Mannerists, a group of anonymous late Gothic painters active in the city from about 1500 to 1520. They were followed by Mannerist painters in the Italian tradition that developed at the end of the High Renaissance. Jan Gossaert was a major artist in the city at this time. Other artists, such as Frans Floris, continued this style.

The iconoclastic riots ('Beeldenstorm' in Dutch) of 1566 that preceded the Dutch Revolt resulted in the destruction of many works of religious art, after which time the churches and monasteries had to be refurnished and redecorated. Artists such as Otto van Veen and members of the Francken family, working in a late mannerist style, provided new religious decoration. It also marked a beginning of economic decline in the city, as the Scheldt river was blockaded by the Dutch Republic in 1585 diminishing trade.

The city experienced an artistic renewal in the 17th century. The large workshops of Peter Paul Rubens and Jacob Jordaens, and the influence of Anthony van Dyck, made Antwerp the center of the Flemish Baroque.  The city was an internationally significant publishing centre, and had a huge production of old master prints and book illustrations.  Antwerp animaliers or animal painters, such as Frans Snyders, Jan Fyt and Paul de Vos dominated this speciality in Europe for at least the first half of the century.  Many artists joined the Guild of Romanists, a society for which having visited Rome was a condition of membership. But as the economy continued to decline, and the Habsburg Governors and the Church reduced their patronage, many artists trained in Antwerp left for the Netherlands, England, France or elsewhere, and by the end of the 17th century Antwerp was no longer a major centre for art.

The artistic legacy of Antwerp is represented in many museums, and paintings of the Antwerp School are valued at auctions.

Antwerp School Artists

Sixteenth century
Pieter Aertsen
Paul Bril
Pieter Bruegel the Elder
Joos van Cleve
Gillis van Coninxloo
Frans Floris
Ambrosius Francken the Elder
Frans Francken the Elder
Hieronymus Francken the Elder
Lucas de Heere
Jan Sanders van Hemessen
Jan Mandijn
Jan Matsys
Quentin Matsys
Joos de Momper
Jan Gossaert
Adam van Noort
Joachim Patinir
Frans Pourbus the Elder
Frans Pourbus the Younger
Bartholomeus Spranger
Otto van Veen
Marten de Vos
Sebastiaan Vranckx

Seventeenth century
Hendrick van Balen
Pieter Boel
Adriaen Brouwer
Jan Brueghel the Elder
Jan Brueghel the Younger
Pieter Brueghel the Younger
Gaspard de Crayer
Abraham van Diepenbeeck
Anthony van Dyck
Frans Francken the Younger
Jan Fyt
Jacob Jordaens
Erasmus Quellinus II
Peter Paul Rubens
Jan Siberechts
Frans Snyders
David Teniers the Younger
Theodoor van Thulden
Adriaen van Utrecht
Cornelis de Vos
Paul de Vos
Jan Wildens
Thomas Willeboirts Bosschaert

16th-century Flemish painters
Antwerp school
Flemish Renaissance painters
Flemish Baroque painters
Flemish landscape painters
Art movements
Culture in Antwerp
Peter Paul Rubens
Netherlandish art
Flemish Baroque art